Lavrentyevo is a rural locality (a village) in Botanovskoye Rural Settlement, Mezhdurechensky District, Vologda Oblast, Russia. The population was 20 as of 2002.

Geography 
Lavrentyevo is located 36 km southwest of Shuyskoye (the district's administrative centre) by road. Pustoshnovo is the nearest rural locality.

References 

Rural localities in Mezhdurechensky District, Vologda Oblast